Temur Mzhavia was the Chairman of the Supreme Council of the de jure Government of the Autonomous Republic of Abkhazia, he left the position in 2009.

See also
2006 Kodori crisis
Battle of the Kodori Valley

References 

Upper Abkhazia
Living people
Government ministers of Abkhazia
Year of birth missing (living people)